International Association of South-East European Studies, better known by its French language abbreviation AIESEE (from ) is an international scholarly, non-political and non-profit professional association focusing on Balkan studies and related fields of studies. The Association was established in Bucharest, capital of Romanian People's Republic, on 23 April 1963 and as of 2019 it brings together 25 member organizations in the field.

The organization was established during the first meeting of what was then 6 Balkan countries' National UNESCO Commissions (Albania, Bulgaria, Greece, Romania, Turkey and Yugoslavia) pushing for regional cooperation despite the Cold War divisions in the region. The founding members ambition was to promote international solidarity, commonalities between Balkan and Third World historical experiences, regional hybridity in links with Mediterranean, Near East and Slavic world, as well as critique of hegemonic representations of the region by scholars from the core countries.

Congresses
 1st Congress (Sofia, 1966)
 3rd Congress (Athens, 1970)
 3rd Congress (Bucharest, 1974)
 4th Congress (Ankara, 1979)
 5th Congress (Belgrade, 1984)
 6th Congress (Sofia, 1989)
 7th Congress (Thessaloniki, 1994)
 8th Congress (Bucharest, 1999)
 9th Congress (Tirana, 2004)
 10th Congress (Paris, 2009)
 11th Congress (Sofia, 2015)
 12th Congress (Bucharest, 2019)
 13th Congress (Skopje, 2024)

See also
 Imagining the Balkans
 Balkan Universities Network
 National Commissions for UNESCO

References

External links
 www.aiesee.org

Balkan studies
Slavic studies
Byzantine studies
Ottoman studies
Organizations established in 1963
Learned societies
International relations in Southeastern Europe
Balkan culture
1963 establishments in Romania
International educational organizations
UNESCO